In enzymology, a 3alpha-hydroxy-5beta-androstane-17-one 3alpha-dehydrogenase is an enzyme that catalyzes the chemical reaction

3alpha-hydroxy-5beta-androstane-17-one + NAD+  5beta-androstane-3,17-dione + NADH + H+

Thus, the two substrates of this enzyme are 3alpha-hydroxy-5beta-androstane-17-one and NAD+, whereas its 3 products are 5beta-androstane-3,17-dione, NADH, and H+.

This enzyme belongs to the family of oxidoreductases, specifically those acting on the CH-OH group of donor with NAD+ or NADP+ as acceptor. The systematic name of this enzyme class is 3alpha-hydroxy-5beta-steroid:NAD+ 3-oxidoreductase. Other names in common use include etiocholanolone 3alpha-dehydrogenase, etiocholanolone 3alpha-dehydrogenase, and 3alpha-hydroxy-5beta-steroid dehydrogenase. This enzyme participates in androgen and estrogen metabolism.

References

 

EC 1.1.1
NADH-dependent enzymes
Enzymes of unknown structure